Agekawa Dam   is a dam in Aga, Niigata Prefecture, Japan, built between 1961 and 1963.

References 

Dams in Niigata Prefecture
Dams completed in 1963